Güray Vural (born 11 June 1988) is a Turkish professional footballer who currently plays as a winger or left back for Antalyaspor. He is a former member of the Turkey national under-21 football team.

International career
Vural made his international debut for the Turkey national team in a friendly 3–1 win over Moldova on 27 March 2017.

Career statistics

Honours
Akhisarspor
 Turkish Super Cup: 2018

References

External links
 

1988 births
Living people
Turkish footballers
Turkey international footballers
Turkey under-21 international footballers
Eskişehirspor footballers
Denizlispor footballers
Akhisarspor footballers
Trabzonspor footballers
Kayserispor footballers
Gaziantep F.K. footballers
Süper Lig players
People from Afyonkarahisar
Association football defenders